Sphagiocrates is a genus of moth in the family Gelechiidae.

Species
 Sphagiocrates chersochlora (Meyrick, 1922)
 Sphagiocrates lusoria (Meyrick, 1922)

References

Gelechiidae